The 2003–04 Elitserien season was the 29th season of Elitserien. It started in September 2003, with the regular season ending February 2004.

Regular season

Final standings

Scoring leaders

Leading goaltenders

Playoffs
After the regular season, the standard of 8 teams qualified for the playoffs.

Playoff bracket
In the first round, the highest remaining seed chose which of the four lowest remaining seeds to be matched against. In each round the higher-seeded team was awarded home ice advantage. Each best-of-seven series followed a 1–1–1–2–1–1 format: the higher-seeded team played at home for games 2 and 4 (plus 5 and 7 if necessary), and the lower-seeded team was at home for game 1, 3 and 6 (if necessary).

Playoff scoring leaders

Playoff leading goaltenders

Elitserien awards

See also
 2003 in sports
 2004 in sports

External links 
Hockeyligan.se — Official site
Swehockey.se — Official statistics

Swe
1
Swedish Hockey League seasons